Anolis caudalis, the Gonave gracile anole or Cochran's gianthead anole, is a species of lizard in the family Dactyloidae. The species is found in Haiti.

References

Anoles
Endemic fauna of Haiti
Reptiles of Haiti
Reptiles described in 1932
Taxa named by Doris Mable Cochran